The 1996 Acura Classic was a women's tennis tournament played on outdoor hard courts at the Manhattan Country Club in Manhattan Beach, California in the United States that was part of Tier II of the 1996 WTA Tour. It was the 23rd edition of the tournament and was held from August 12 through August 18, 1996.

Finals

Singles

 Lindsay Davenport defeated  Anke Huber 6–2, 6–3
 It was Davenport's 5th title of the year and the 15th of her career.

Doubles

 Lindsay Davenport /  Natasha Zvereva defeated  Amy Frazier /  Kimberly Po 6–1, 6–4
 It was Davenport's 6th title of the year and the 16th of her career. It was Zvereva's 2nd title of the year and the 62nd of her career.

References

External links
 ITF tournament edition details

Acura Classic
LA Women's Tennis Championships
Sports competitions in Manhattan Beach, California
Acura Classic
Acura Classic
Acura Classic